The Joseph Huber Brewing Company was founded in 1845 in Monroe, Wisconsin. Originally called The Blumer Brewery, it adopted the Huber name in 1947. It is the oldest continually operating brewery in the Midwest and second oldest in the United States.

Huber reached its most successful point around 1978, when its Augsburger brand received awards from several prominent beer reviewers and became a top seller for the company. The brewery was sold in 1985 for $7.8 million; in 1988 the new owners sold the Augsburger label to Stroh Brewery Company and later briefly closed the brewery.  Fred Huber, son of Joseph, bought the brewery and resumed operations in a partnership with Chicago's Berghoff family, but the brewery filed for bankruptcy and was sold in 1995. In 2006, the brewery and its brands were sold to Mountain Crest Brewing Company,  of Calgary, Alberta, Canada. The Monroe brewery was renamed Minhas Craft Brewery.

Recognition 
2014 - Certificate of Excellence - Ranked #1 of 11 Attractions in Monroe on Trip Advisor
2014 - Minhas Craft Brewery Huber Bock awarded Silver for best bock from the World Beer Awards.World Beer Awards

References

External links
Minhas Craft Brewery Website

Beer brewing companies based in Wisconsin
Root beer